The Athenaeum is a family-owned five-star hotel overlooking Green Park in Piccadilly, London.

History
Hope House was built at 116 Piccadilly in 1849–1850 by Henry Pelham-Clinton, the 6th Duke of Newcastle. The name Athenaeum first appears around 1864 when the house was bought by the Junior Athenaeum Club. The house was redeveloped in the 1930s as an art deco apartment block, still called the Athenaeum.

In 1971 The Rank Organisation purchased the 1930s Athenaeum Court apartment block, opening it as The Athenaeum Hotel after a two-year refurbishment. Through Rank's direct links to Hollywood the hotel attracted guests including Steven Spielberg, Marlon Brando, Harrison Ford, Lauren Bacall, Liza Minnelli and Warren Beatty. Rank encouraged the stars of its films (including Elizabeth Taylor) to take up residence at the hotel whilst working on projects in England. The Hollywood Reporter observed that there were more movie stars to be seen in London's Athenaeum than in the Polo Lounge of the Beverly Hills Hotel.

For over twenty years Sally Bulloch was the Executive Manager. 

The current General Manager Joanne Taylor Stagg took over in 2019 

In 1992, the Athenaeum was purchased by Ralph Trustees Limited, a family-run business who also own The Grove in Hertfordshire and the Runnymede Hotel & Spa near Windsor. More recent celebrity guests include , Kim Kardashian and Mel B.

Location
The Athenaeum's postcode is W1J 7BJ, right in the heart of Mayfair.

Kid's Concierge
The Hotel has a dedicated Kid's Concierge service which takes care of children's needs and helps families to plan itineraries. The Athenaeum also provides age-appropriate toys to children upon arrival.

Awards
The hotel has 5 red stars and 2 red rosettes from the AA.

The website travelandleisure.com put the Athenaeum in its list of the 500 best hotels in the world in 2008.

Afternoon Tea at the Athenaeum has received an Award of Excellence from the UK Tea Guild for Top London Afternoon Tea 2008.

References
Footnotes

Citations

External links
 The Athenaeum website 

Hotels in the City of Westminster
Hotels established in 1973
Buildings and structures on Piccadilly
1973 establishments in England